Ira Madiyama (August Sun) is a 2005 Sri Lankan bilingual feature film directed by Award-winning Prasanna Vithanage and produced by Soma Edirisinghe for EAP Films. It stars Peter D'Almeida, and Nimmi Harasgama in lead roles along with Namal Jayasinghe and Mohamed Rahfiulla. Music composed by Lakshman Joshep de Saram. It is the 1047th film in Sri Lankan cinema.

The film premiered at the Montreal World Film Festival. A website "www.iramadiyama.com" was launched along with the film, which is for the first time in Sri Lanka.

Synopsis
Ira Madiyama (August Sun) is set in Sri Lanka during the mid-1990s and tells three simultaneous stories against the backdrop of the country's savage civil war (1983 – 2009).

Chamari (Nimmi Harasgama) is searching for her husband, a Sinhalese Sri Lankan Air Force pilot shot down in flight, whom she believes has been taken prisoner by the Tamil Tigers. Desperate to know the truth, she enlists a sympathetic journalist and sets out on a journey to track him down.

Meanwhile, eleven-year-old Tamil Muslim Arfath (Mohamed Rahfiulla) is struggling to keep his companion and friend, a dog, while the family together with the entire village is forced to evacuate by a rebel army.

The third narrative follows Duminda (Namal Jayasinghe), a young soldier who walks into a brothel to find his sister among the working girls.

The main action of the film takes place in Sri Lanka's northern territories, parts of which are controlled by the Tamil rebels who have created a de facto separate state.

These stories are about people who are struggling to hold on to their hopes and dreams while being swept up by the torrents of war. The film is about their quest for life.

Cast
 Peter D'Almeida as Saman Gunawardena
 Nimmi Harasgama as Chamari
 Mohamed Rahfiulla as Aralath
 A. A. Mansoor as Hasan
 Namal Jayasinghe as Duminda
 Nadee Kammalaweera as Kamani
 Maheswari Rathnam as Aralath's mother
 Rajeena Begum as Aralath's Sister
 H. V. Thaheera as Aralath's Grandmother
 Chandra Kaluarachchi as Duminda's mother
 Gayani Gisanthika as Girl at Brothel
 Nilar N. Kasim as TV Presenter
 Sampath Jayaweera as Duminda's friend
 Mahesh Mayra Nisal as Duminda's friend
 Kumara Thirimadura as Checkpoint officer

Music
The original music for Ira Madiyama was composed by Lakshman Joseph De Saram.

Trivia
 Ira Madiyama (August Sun) was a bi-lingual film in Sinhala & Tamil.
 The father and son characters of Hassan and Arfath, were real-life refugees who had fled their hometown of Mannar under similar circumstances.
 Although, set against the backdrop of war and ethnic conflict the film focused on the social fabrics of the nation. There were no warfare scenes in the film.
 The events in Ira Madiyama (August Sun) take place on the day Sri Lanka became world champions when they beat Australia in the 1996 Cricket World Cup final in Lahore, Pakistan. It is also the period immediately following the breakdown of the first attempt at peace talks between the Sri Lankan government and the Liberation Tigers of Tamil Eelam (LTTE). So it was a time of great tension and uncertainty mixed with elation at the cricketing success.

Theatrical Release

Sri Lanka

Ira Madiyama (August Sun) saw its domestic release across Sri Lanka on 10 February 2005. It opened across 16 centres islandwide. It ran for 55 days to good critical and commercial response.

Singapore
Ira Madiyama (August Sun) and Akasa Kusum (Flowers of the Sky) are set for limited release from 18 June 2010, at Sinema Old School a 136-seater high definition cinema screening local and award-winning films in Singapore.

International Film Festivals

Awards

 Grand Prix - Special Mention, Fribourg International Film Festival, Switzerland
 FIPRESCI - NETPAC Award, Singapore International Film Festival, Singapore
 Best Film - Silver Award Lady Harimaguada De Plata, Las Palmas International Film Festival, Canary Islands
 Best Actress - Nimmi Harasgama, Las Palmas International Film Festival, Canary Islands
 Grand Jury Prize, Makati Cinemanila International Film Festival, Philippines

Official Selections

 Montreal World Film Festival, Canada (World Premiere)
 Quebec International Film Festival, Canada
 International Film Festival of India, India
 Chennai International Film Festival, India
 Kolkata Film Festival, India
 Pusan International Film Festival, Korea
 London Film Festival, United Kingdom
 Bite the Mango, Bradford, United Kingdom
 Amiens International Film Festival, France
 Deauville Asian Film Festival, France
 Fukuoka International Film Festival, Japan
 Cinequest International Film Festival, United States
 Istanbul International Film Festival, Turkey
 Durbun International Film Festival, South Africa
 Hong Kong Asian Film Festival, Hong Kong SAR
 Taiwan Film Festival, Chinese Taipei
 Film Fest Hamburg, Germany
 Dhaka International Film Festival, Bangladesh
 Films from the South Festival, Oslo, Norway

References

External links
 Official Site - Prasanna Vithanage
 Official Site - Sinema.sg

2000s Sinhala-language films
Films about the Sri Lankan Civil War
2003 films
Films set in Sri Lanka (1948–present)
Films directed by Prasanna Vithanage
Films with screenplays by Prasanna Vithanage